Whiteflag Project is a band of Jewish musicians from Israel and Arab musicians from the Gaza Strip. They are a one of a kind 'world fusion' band formed within the most conflicting areas of the Middle East – Israel and Palestine. Their songs are sung in the band members' native tongues of Arabic, Hebrew and English. Their collaboration as a band has endured many political difficulties as a result of the ongoing Israeli–Palestinian conflict.

History

Discography

References

External links
 Whiteflag Project official website
 Timesunion.com
 Enact.org.nz
 Last.fm
 Womex.com

Israeli folk music groups
Israeli ethnic musical groups
World music groups